Mount Cotter, located in the Kings Canyon National Park, is named for Dick Cotter who was a packer with the California Geological Survey in 1864. Cotter and Clarence King made the first ascent of Mount Tyndall.

The mountain is easily climbed from Gardiner Basin with a  slope. There are more difficult routes found on the north and east sides of Mount Cotter. The mountain features a large class 4-5 summit block. Mount Cotter can be reached from the west or east side of the Sierra Nevada.

Wilderness permits are required for overnight stays entering from either the east or west. There is a Visitors Center in Grant Grove that can inform visitors of when the office at Road's End will be open.

Camping is allowed in many places along the approach to Mt Cotter. Kearsarge Lakes, Charlotte Lake, and Rae Lakes all have a maximum 2 nights stay, and Bullfrog Lake along the Kearsarge Pass Trail is closed to camping. Bear canisters are required for overnight stays.

References

Mountains of Kings Canyon National Park
Mountains of Fresno County, California
Mountains of Northern California